Vladimir Ivanovich Merkulov (28 December 1922 — 26 November 2003) was a Soviet fighter pilot and flying ace during World War II. Awarded the title Hero of the Soviet Union on 26 October 1944 for his initial victories, by the end of the war his tally reached 29 solo and four shared shootdowns.

References 

1922 births
2003 deaths
Soviet World War II flying aces
Heroes of the Soviet Union
Recipients of the Order of Lenin
Recipients of the Order of the Red Banner
Recipients of the Order of the Red Star